Maria Sophia of Dietrichstein (Maria Rosina Sophia; 11 July 1646 – 4 November 1711), was a German noblewoman by birth member of the House of Dietrichstein and by her two marriages Countess of Pötting auf Ober-Falkenstein and Lobkowicz.

She was the fifth child and second daughter of Maximilian, 2nd Prince of Dietrichstein zu Nikolsburg, and his second wife Sophie Agnes, a daughter of Wolfgang III, Count of Mansfeld-Vorderort-Bornstädt.

Life

On April 16, 1662  Maria Sophia married Franz Eusebius, Count of Pötting auf Ober-Falkenstein (d. 1678). They had three children, all of them born in Madrid, who died in infancy: María Inés, Francisca Eusebia and Maximiliano Adán.

On 12 June 1681, Maria Sophia married secondly with Count Václav Ferdinand Popel of Lobkowicz (22 December 1654 – 8 October 1697). They had five children:

 Leopold Josef (17 January 1683 – 19 May 1707).
 Terezie Ludmila (23 January 1684 – 7 August 1684).
 Eleonore Katharina Charlotte (1 April 1685 – 3 March 1712), married on 17 October 1703 to Filip Hyacint Josef, Prince of Lobkowicz.
 Ludvík Filip (12 August 1687 – 27 December 1687).
 Ferdinand (born and died 28 May 1689).

Maria Sophia died aged 65. She was buried in Loreta, Prague.

Notes

1652 births
1711 deaths
Dietrichstein family